Hairstyles of Japanese women have been varied throughout history. Since the 7th century, Japanese noblewomen have sought out elaborate and structured ways to wear their hair to show off their elite status. This included hairdos built of wax, ribbons, combs, hair picks, and flowers.

Kepatsu- a Chinese inspired style 

The noblewomen of the early 7th century would wear their hair  "very high and boxy at the front, with a sickle-shaped ponytail at the back, sometimes called "hair bound with a red string."" They would call this hairstyle "kepatsu" because it was inspired by the Chinese fashion of the era.

Taregami 
The noblewomen of Japan started to abandon Chinese fashions and create their own style of sense and practicality. This occurred around 794 and lasted about 1345, during Heian period. The style at this time was to wear long, loose, straight hair. "Floor-length black tresses were considered the height of beauty." The 11th-century novel  describes women showing off their long, flowing hair.

Shimada mage 
This hairstyle first appeared during the Edo period. Women began putting wax in their hair and pulling back a number of different buns and decorated it by adding combs, sticks, sometimes even flower and ribbons. This version is relatively simple compared to what would come in later years of this style.  This was the main style of a Geisha

"Those who would wear this hairstyle during this period were young and ordinary women.

Variants of the shimada are the Taka Shimada, Tsubushi Shimada, Uiwata, Momoware, and Torobin Shimada.

 The Taka Shimada is a stylish knot of hair more than it is a bun, sported by newlyweds. 
 An older woman would wear the Tsubushi Shimada, which was a flat kind of Taka Shimada. 
 The Uiwata differentiates itself because of the use of colored cotton crepe that ties it together. 
 The Momoware holds a bun up, that is crossed by a section of hair, giving the impression of a peach that is cut in half. 
 The Torobin Shimada was the most elaborate of them all, with extra folds of hair that would widely stick out on the sides, resembling a Toro lantern."

See also
 List of hairstyles

References 

Japanese
Japanese fashion